Empress Hu (20 May 1402 – 5 December 1443), personal name Hu Shanxiang, was a Chinese empress consort of the Ming dynasty, married to the Xuande Emperor. She was posthumously honoured with the title Empress Gongrangzhang.

Early life
Empress Hu was born in  1400 in Jining in present day Shandong Province. Her given name was Hu Shanxiang. She came from Jining in Shandong. Her father, Hu Rong, was a company commander (baihu). In 1417, she became the primary consort of Zhu Zhanji, the grandson-heir. Three years later in 1420, they had a daughter, the Princess Shunde. When Zhu Zhanji's father, Hongxi Emperor ascended the throne in 1424, she was appointed Crown Princess.

Empress
Upon the succession of Xuande to the throne in 1425, she became his empress. Empress Hu was described as weak and sickly. The emperor did not like her for not having a son, and when she at one occasion advised him not to indulge in his love of travel, he resented her for meddling in affairs that did not concern her.

Xuande preferred the beautiful and intelligent Noble Consort Sun, and when she gave birth to a son in 1427, he named this son Crown prince, and eagerly worked to promote her status further. Five Grand Secretaries were ordered to prepare a legal method to depose her. Grand Secretary Yang Shiqi, after failing to convince the emperor of the danger in deposing the empress without good reason, argued that it would offend his reputation. However, he was unable to avert her dismissal on the ground of having no son, being frequently ill, and of being sterile. He then suggested that she should respectfully resign herself, and that she should be well treated for the rest of her life.

And so in the spring of 1428, the emperor had Empress Hu deposed from her position in favour of the mother of the crown prince, sent to Chang'an Palace and given a title of Immortal Teacher of Quietude and Maternal Compassion, previously given to deposed empresses who were forced to become nuns, although this religious element was not demanded of Hu.

Later life and death
Hu was regarded with sympathy and her mother-in-law, the empress dowager, demonstrated her sympathy and friendship by often inviting her to stay with her in the Qingning Palace, and giving her the place of an empress at banquets in the inner palace, even when her successor, Empress Sun was present. When the empress dowager died in 1442, Hu lost an important ally at court.

She was ranked a consort, and thus no longer enjoyed an equal status with Empress Sun. She died of illness in 1443. She was buried in Jinshan according to rites prescribed for a concubine.

When Empress Dowager Sun died in 1462, Empress Qian, consort of Emperor Yingzong, urged him to restore Hu's status as empress. Accordingly,  in the summer of 1463, her title as empress was restored, a mausoleum was constructed for her according to the rites prescribed for an empress, and she was given the posthumous title Empress Gongrang Chengshun Kangmu Jingci Zhang (恭讓誠順康穆静慈章皇后).

Titles
During the reign of the Jianwen Emperor (r. 1398–1402):
 Lady Hu (胡氏; from 20 May 1402)
During the reign of the Yongle Emperor (r. 1402–1424):
 Consort of the Imperial Grandson-heir (皇太孫嬪; from 1417)
During the reign of the Hongxi Emperor (r. 1424 –1425)
 Crown Princess (皇太子妃; from 1424)
During the reign of the Xuande Emperor (r. 1425–1435):
Empress (皇后; from 27 June 1425)
Jingci Xianshi (靜慈仙師; from 1428)
During the reign of the Tianshun Emperor (r. 1457–1464):
Empress Gongrang Chengshun Kangmu Jingci Zhang (恭讓誠順康穆静慈章皇后; from the summer of 1463)

Issue
As consort of the Imperial Grandson-heir: 
Princess Shunde (順德公主; 1420–1443), the Xuande Emperor's first daughter
Princess Yongqing (永清公主; d. 1433), the Xuande Emperor's second daughter

In popular culture
Portrayed by Deng Jiajia in the 2019 Chinese television series Ming Dynasty.
Portrayed by Zhang Nan in Royal Feast "尚食" 2022.

References

Sources

1443 deaths
Ming dynasty posthumous empresses
15th-century Chinese women
15th-century Chinese people
1402 births
People from Jining